Theodorus Hubertus Antonius "Theo" Nikkessen (born 18 August 1941) is a retired Dutch amateur track cyclist. He competed at the 1960 Summer Olympics in the 4 km team pursuit and finished in fifth place.

See also
 List of Dutch Olympic cyclists

References

1941 births
Living people
Dutch male cyclists
Olympic cyclists of the Netherlands
Cyclists at the 1960 Summer Olympics
People from Bergen, Limburg
Cyclists from Limburg (Netherlands)